Teseo Taddia (20 April 1920 – 23 December 1982) was a hammer thrower from Italy. He won three medals, at senior level, at the International athletics competitions.

Biography
He twice competed for his native country at the Summer Olympics: in 1948 and 1952. Born in Bondeno, Ferrara he set his personal best (59.17 metres) in the men's hammer throw event in 1950.

National titles
He won 14 national championships at senior level,
Italian Athletics Championships
Hammer throw: 1939, 1941, 1942, 1943, 1945, 1947, 1948, 1949, 1950, 1951, 1953, 1954, 1955, 1956

See also
 Italian all-time top lists - Hammer throw

References

External links
 

1920 births
1982 deaths
Italian male hammer throwers
Athletes (track and field) at the 1948 Summer Olympics
Athletes (track and field) at the 1952 Summer Olympics
Olympic athletes of Italy
European Athletics Championships medalists
Mediterranean Games gold medalists for Italy
Athletes (track and field) at the 1951 Mediterranean Games
Athletes (track and field) at the 1955 Mediterranean Games
Mediterranean Games medalists in athletics